The Portuguese women's national under-17 football team represents Portugal in international youth football competitions.

FIFA U-17 Women's World Cup

The team has never qualified for the  FIFA U-17 Women's World Cup

UEFA Women's Under-17 Championship

Portugal have qualified for two UEFA Women's Under-17 Championships with their best performance being a semi-final finish in the UEFA Euro 2019.

References

External links

F
Youth football in Portugal
Women's national under-17 association football teams